Jordane Nicolle (born 20 December 1982) is a Zimbabwean cricketer. He played fourteen first-class matches between 2001 and 2005.

Education
Nicolle attended Falcon College before studying for a year at Stellenbosch University.

See also
 CFX Academy cricket team

References

External links
 

1982 births
Living people
Zimbabwean cricketers
CFX Academy cricketers
Matabeleland cricketers
Mashonaland cricketers
Sportspeople from Bulawayo
Alumni of Falcon College
Stellenbosch University alumni